Jules Gouffé (1807 – 28 February 1877) was a renowned French chef and pâtissier. He was nicknamed l'apôtre de la cuisine décorative.

He had a deep impact on the evolution of French gastronomy by gathering an immense knowledge that he wrote down in his Le Livre de Cuisine and his Le Livre de Pâtisserie. Revered by great names such as Bernard Loiseau and molecular gastronomy researchers, such as Hervé This,<ref>Compte rendu du Séminaire N° 36 de Gastronomie moléculaire, 15 avril 2004, [https://books.google.com/books?id=ngngB87WwRwC Cours de gastronomie moléculaire n°2, décembre 2006.]</ref> his legacy is still vibrant among cooks of today.

Biography
His learning began under the supervision of his father, who owned a pâtisserie (pastry shop) on Neuve Saint-Merri street, Paris. Gouffé became Antonin Carême's pupil at the age of 16, with whom he remained for seven years. Gouffé relates in his Livre de Pâtisserie that Carême who was passing by, stopped to admire the pièces montées that were on display, congratulating the proprietor and offering to take his son under his protection.

His first job was during the ball held in 1823 by the city of Paris in honor of the Duc d'Angoulême to celebrate the Spanish Expedition which 7000 guests attended.

In 1840 he opened a shop at rue du Faubourg Saint-Honoré which soon gained fame. He sold the shop in 1855 and then became inactive.

Most of his works were translated into English by his brother, Alphonse Gouffé, Head Pastry Cook to Queen Victoria.

WorksLe Livre de Cuisine: comprenant la cuisine de ménage et la grande cuisine avec 25 planches imprimées en chromolithographie et 161 gravures sur bois dessinées d'après nature par E. Ronjat, Paris, Librairie Hachette (1867) Read on line   
(The Royal Cookery Book)Le Livre de Pâtisserie: Ouvrage contenant 10 planches chromolithographiques et 137 gravures sur bois d'après les peintures à l'huile et les dessins de E. Ronjat, Paris, Librairie Hachette (1873) Read on line  
(The Royal Book of Pastry and Confectionery) Recettes pour préparer et conserver les Viandes et les Poissons salés et fumés, les terrines, les galantines, les légumes, les fruits, les confitures, les liqueurs de famille, les sirops, les petits fours, etc., Paris, Librairie Hachette (1869) (Le Livre des conserves) 
(The Book of Preserves)Le Livre de Soupes et des Potages contenant plus de 400 recettes de potages français et étrangers (1872) (Le Livre de soupes et des potages) 
(The Book of Soups'')

References

External links
 Le livre de cuisine
 Le livre de pâtisserie 

French chefs
French cuisine
1807 births
1877 deaths